Walkford is a suburb of Christchurch, in the civil parish of Highcliffe and Walkford, in the Bournemouth, Christchurch and Poole district, in the county of Dorset, England.

Politics 
Walkford shares a parish council and a BCP Council ward with Highcliffe. Walkford is part of the Christchurch parliamentary constituency for elections to the House of Commons. It is currently represented by Conservative MP Christopher Chope.

Culture 
Walkford was used as a filming location for One Foot in the Grave.

References 

Populated places in Dorset
Areas of Christchurch, Dorset